Sailor Moon is a Japanese media franchise beginning with the Sailor Moon manga series (1991–1997) by Naoko Takeuchi.

Sailor Moon may also refer to:


Sailor Moon franchise

Characters
Sailor Moon (character), the main character in Sailor Moon media

Adaptations
Sailor Moon (TV series), a 1992–1997 anime based on the manga
Sailor Moon Crystal, a 2014 original net animation reboot of the Sailor Moon franchise
Sailor Moon Eternal, a 2021 two-part film continuation of the Sailor Moon Crystal series
Pretty Guardian Sailor Moon (2003 TV series), a 2003–2004 live-action television show
Sailor Moon musicals, the stage musicals, also known as SeraMyu
List of Sailor Moon video games, video games based on the series
Sailor Moon, a 1993 SNES video game
Pretty Soldier Sailor Moon (arcade game), a 1995 arcade video game
Sailor Moon Collectible Card Game, a card game released in North America
Sailor Moon (North American live-action adaptation), an unaired pilot